Głosy is a Polish motion picture directed by Janusz Kijowski and released in 1982. The film was awarded for best sound and best leading actor at the Polish Film Festival in Gdynia in 1981.

Crew 
 Director: Janusz Kijowski
 Writer: Janusz Kijowski
 Starring: Ewa DałkowskaKrzysztof Zaleski
 Music by: Jerzy Matula
 Cinematography by: Krzysztof Wyszyński
 Editing by: Irena Choryńska
 Stage design by: Anna Jekiełek,  Adam Kopczyński

External links
 

1982 films
1980s Polish-language films
1980s psychological films